Muteb Al-Mutlaq (Arabic: متعب المطلق, born 10 December 1997) is a Saudi football player who currently plays for Al-Shoulla.

Career
Al-Mutlaq started his career at Al-Nassr's youth teams. On 27 January 2018, Al-Mutlaq joined Al-Raed on loan. On 1 August 2018, Al-Mutlaq's loan to Al-Raed was renewed for another season. On 27 August 2019, Al-Mutlaq joined Al-Raed on a permanent deal. On 30 October 2020, Al-Mutlaq joined Al-Sahel on loan. On 7 July 2022, Al-Mutlaq joined Al-Shoulla.

References

External links 
 

1997 births
Living people
Sportspeople from Riyadh
Al Nassr FC players
Al-Raed FC players
Al-Sahel SC (Saudi Arabia) players
Al-Shoulla FC players
Saudi Professional League players
Saudi First Division League players
Association football fullbacks
Saudi Arabian footballers